The solo discography of Jarvis Cocker, an English musician, consists of five studio albums, six singles and numerous collaborations with other artists. He is best known as the founder, frontman and songwriter for the band Pulp.

He has also released seven studio albums, one extended play, 10 compilation albums and 24 singles with Pulp, and one album and two extended plays with his other band Relaxed Muscle, which he formed with Darren Buckle. This discography does not contain work released by those bands.

Cocker embarked on his solo career after Pulp entered an extended hiatus from 2003.

Albums

Studio albums

A  Jarvis also charted at #13 in the US Top Heatseekers chart and #34 in the Top Independent Albums chart.
B  "Further Complications." charted at #5 in the US Top Heatseekers chart, #21 in the Top Independent Albums chart and #50 in the Top Rock Albums chart.
C  Room 29 charted at #10 in the US Classical Crossover albums chart.

Remix albums

Extended plays

Singles

Notes
A ^ Digital download only single. Charted in 2019.
B ^  The A-side "Girls Like It Too" did not appear on the Further Complications album.

As featured artist

As featured artist

As writer or session musician

Other
The Trip (curated with Steve Mackey) (2006)
Music From Jarvis Cocker’s Sunday Service (2019)
This House is... closing theme to the film The House (2022)

Music videos

References

Discography
Discographies of British artists